Chistye Bory is an urban locality (an urban-type settlement) in Buysky District of Kostroma Oblast, Russia. Population:

References

Urban-type settlements in Kostroma Oblast
Buysky District